Paulo Vitor may refer to:

 Paulo Vítor (footballer, born 1957), born Paulo Vítor Barbosa de Carvalho, Brazilian football goalkeeper
 Paulo Vitor Damo da Rosa (born 1987), Brazilian Magic: The Gathering player
 Paulo Vítor (footballer, born 1988), born Paulo Vítor Fagundes dos Anjos, Brazilian football goalkeeper
 Paulo Vitor (footballer, born 1999), born Paulo Vitor Fernandes Pereira, Brazilian football winger

See also
 Paulo Victor (disambiguation)
 Paul Victor (footballer) (born 1984), Dominica football defender